The Sultan Palace was the home of eminent lawyer and judge Sir Sultan Ahmad.  It is situated at Veer Chand Patel Marg in Patna.

History
It was built for Sir Sultan Ahmad, an Advocate and judge in Patna high court, in 1922.

Architecture
It was built on a 10 acre parcel. It took two years to complete with an outlay of 3 lakh. It was designed by Ali Jaan. White marble is widespread. It was built in Islamic style with a high, domed tower in the center, domed pavilions at the corners, minarets and multi-foliated arches in the facade. The palace is divided into two parts: the front is for males and the rear for females. The most important portion is the drawing room in the front with a fireplace, moulding and an ornamental ceiling painted with gold powder.

Location
It is 2–3 km from Patna Junction, 4–5 km from Patna Airport, 5–6 km from Mithapur bus stand.

See also
 Golghar
 Patna Museum
 Rizwan Castle

References

External links
 
 

Buildings and structures in Patna